The Harlan J. Smith Telescope is a  telescope located at the McDonald Observatory, in Texas, in the United States. This telescope is one of several research telescopes that are part of the University of Texas at Austin observatory perched on Mount Locke in the Davis Mountains of west Texas. The telescope was completed in 1968 with substantial NASA assistance, and is named after Harlan James Smith, the first Texas director of McDonald Observatory. Smith was the Observatory Director for 26 years.

Vandalism damage
The telescope was the victim of an act of vandalism in February 1970. A newly hired worker suffered a mental breakdown and brought a hand gun into the observatory. After firing one shot at his supervisor, the worker then fired the remaining rounds into the Primary Mirror. The holes effectively reduced the  telescope to the equivalent of a 106-inch telescope (or about 2.5 centimeters less), but did not affect the quality of the telescope's images, only the amount of light it can collect.

Observations
The telescope has been used to observe many things. Some achievements includes the stars BD +17° 3248 and XO-1.

Jorge Meléndez of the Australian National University and Iván Ramírez of the University of Texas discovered the star HIP 56948 in 2007 using the Harlan J. Smith telescope at McDonald Observatory.

The Visible Integral-field Replicable Unit Spectrograph-W (VIRUS-W) (an integral field spectrograph) was used to find in 2021 that the Leo 1 dwarf galaxy contains a super massive black hole.

Contemporaries on commissioning
Four largest telescopes 1968:

See also
List of largest optical reflecting telescopes

References

Telescope Shot

Optical telescopes